Aldora is a town in Lamar County, Georgia, United States. As of the 2020 census, the city had a recorded population of 0, due to a "0 percent self-response rate" to the 2020 census. The actual population was estimated at 103.

History
The Georgia General Assembly incorporated Aldora as a town in 1906.

Geography
Aldora is located in south-central Lamar County at  (33.049078, -84.175552). It is bordered to the east by Barnesville, the county seat.

Georgia State Route 18 passes through the south side of the town, leading east into Barnesville and west  to Zebulon. U.S. Route 41 forms the eastern border of the town; US-41 least north  to Griffin and east the same distance to Forsyth.

The town drains west to Little Potato Creek, a tributary of Potato Creek and part of the Flint River watershed.

Demographics

As of the census of 2000, there were 98 people, 43 households, and 30 families residing in the town. The racial makeup of the town was 100.00% White.

There were 43 households, out of which 23.3% had children under the age of 18 living with them, 58.1% were married couples living together, 11.6% had a female householder with no husband present, and 30.2% were non-families. 27.9% of all households were made up of individuals, and 18.6% had someone living alone who was 65 years of age or older. The average household size was 2.28 and the average family size was 2.73.

In the town, the population was spread out, with 19.4% under the age of 18, 4.1% from 18 to 24, 22.4% from 25 to 44, 28.6% from 45 to 64, and 25.5% who were 65 years of age or older. The median age was 50 years. For every 100 females, there were 92.2 males. For every 100 females age 18 and over, there were 92.7 males.

The median income for a household in the town was $22,083, and the median income for a family was $22,083. Males had a median income of $20,625 versus $19,583 for females. The per capita income for the town was $10,693. There were 10.7% of families and 11.8% of the population living below the poverty line, including 25.0% of under eighteens and 16.7% of those over 64.

References

Towns in Lamar County, Georgia
Towns in Georgia (U.S. state)